The 2013 South American Youth Games, also known as the I South American Youth Games, was a multi-sport event celebrated in Lima, Peru from September 20 to 29, 2013. Approximately 1,200 athletes from 14 National Olympic Committees (NOCs) competed in 95 events from 19 sports and disciplines, making the first event in the history of the games.

Nations

Participating teams
All 15 nations of the Organización Deportiva Suramericana (ODESUR) are expected to compete in these Youth Games.

  (host)

Sports

Medals
Key
 Host nation (Peru)

References

External links

South American Youth Games
2013 in South American sport
2013 in Peruvian sport
2010s in Lima
Sports competitions in Lima
International sports competitions hosted by Peru
September 2013 sports events in South America